The Arts festival in Marrakech, now the Marrakech Biennale,  first took place in 2005. It was set up by Vanessa Branson and Abel Damoussi with the help of curator Danny Moynihan and Liberatum creator Pablo Ganguli. It is the first major Trilingual (English, Arabic & French) festival in North Africa. It focuses on cutting-edge contemporary Visual Art, Literature, and Film. It consists of a main Visual Arts Exhibition, other arts exhibitions, installations and happenings, discussions, debates and screenings based in the eclectic venues and settings that Marrakech has to offer. AiM is now known as Marrakech Biennale. The sixth biennale, in 2016, was organized by Guggenheim Abu Dhabi curator Reem Fadda and its main venues were the 16th-century El Badi Palace and the 19th-century El Bahia Palace. It featured work including the sculpture À l'abri...de rien by Fatiha Zemmouri.

References

External links 
 2012 Visual Arts Program Website
 Arts In Marrakech International Biennale Website
 Exhibition Website
 AiM Liberatum Website
 L'appartement 22

Festivals in Morocco
Literary festivals in Morocco
Moroccan literature
Marrakesh
Festivals established in 2005
Arab art scene
Arts festivals in Morocco